Simone Rossetti (born 9 June 1997) is an Italian professional footballer who plays as a forward for  club Taranto on loan from Renate.

Club career
Born in Castel San Pietro Terme, Rossetti was formed in Bologna youth system. He made his senior debut for Serie D club Castiadas on  2016–17 season. The fordwad left Bologna in 2017, and signed for Serie C club Imolese. He also played for Modena, Matelica and Novara, all Serie C clubs.

On 11 August 2021, he joined Serie C club Renate.

On 4 January 2023, Rossetti was loaned to Taranto.

References

External links
 
 

1997 births
Living people
People from Castel San Pietro Terme
Sportspeople from the Metropolitan City of Bologna
Footballers from Emilia-Romagna
Italian footballers
Association football forwards
Serie C players
Serie D players
Bologna F.C. 1909 players
A.S.D. Mezzolara players
Virtus Francavilla Calcio players
Imolese Calcio 1919 players
Modena F.C. 2018 players
S.S. Matelica Calcio 1921 players
Novara F.C. players
A.C. Renate players
Taranto F.C. 1927 players